Wilhelm Phillip Daniel Schulz (6 March 1805 – 1 August 1877), also known as Guillermo Schulz, was a German mine engineer and geologist who spent most of his professional life in Spain. He was born in Dörnberg and died in Aranjuez.

Career
In 1826 Schulz went to Spain, and shortly was hired by the Spanish Government to enhance the mining industry in the country. In 1833 he was appointed Mining Inspector for Asturias and Galicia, and in 1844 General Mining Inspector for Asturias. It was in Asturias where, for many years, he carried out outstanding geological and industrial work which he made public in several books. In 1854 he moved to Madrid, where he taught in the Mining Engineering School and was vice-president of the Geological Institute.

1805 births
1877 deaths
People from Kassel (district)
19th-century German geologists